California's 1st congressional district is a U.S. congressional district in California. Doug LaMalfa, a Republican, has represented the district since January 2013. Currently, it encompasses the northeastern part of the state. Since the 2022 election, it includes the counties of Butte, Colusa, Glenn, Lassen, Modoc, Shasta, Siskiyou, Sutter, and Tehama, and most of Yuba County. The largest cities in the district are Chico, Redding, and Yuba City.

Prior to redistricting in 2021, it included Butte County, Lassen County, Modoc County, Plumas County, Shasta County, Sierra County, Siskiyou County, Tehama County, most of Nevada County, part of Glenn County and part of Placer County. In the 2021 redistricting, it added the Yuba-Sutter area and removed most of its share of the Sierra Nevada.

Competitiveness 
Prior to 2013, the GOP last held the seat in 1998 when U.S. Representative Frank Riggs decided to run for the U.S. Senate. Riggs was replaced by long-time Democratic Assemblyman and State Senator Mike Thompson. Redistricting in 2001 added Democratic-leaning areas of Yolo County.

John Kerry won the district in 2004 presidential election with 59.7% of the vote. Barack Obama carried the district in 2008 presidential election with 65.60% of the vote. The redistricting after the 2010 census made the district much more Republican-leaning; Mitt Romney and Donald Trump won the district by double digits in 2012, 2016, and 2020 respectively.

Election results from statewide races

Composition 

Since the 2020 redistricting, California's 1st district is located in northeastern California. It encompasses Butte, Colusa, Glenn, Lassen, Modoc, Shasta, Siskiyou, Sutter, and Tehama Counties, as well as part Yuba County.

Yuba County is split between this district and the 3rd district. They are partitioned by State Highway 70, Ellis Rd, and Union Pacific. The 1st district takes in the city of Marysville and the surrounding census-designated areas.

Cities 10,000 people or more
 Chico - 101,475
 Redding - 95,542
 Yuba City - 70,117
 Oroville - 20,737
 Susanville - 16,728
 Red Bluff - 14,710
 Anderson - 11,323
 Shasta Lake - 10,121

2,500-10,000 people
 Live Oak - 8,912
 Corning - 8,244
 Orland - 7,622
 Gridley - 7,224
 Colusa - 6,411
 Willows - 6,072
 Williams - 5,408
 Wheatland - 3,873
 Alturas - 2,715

List of members representing the district

Election results

1864

1866

1868

1870

1872

1874

1876

1878

1880

1882

1884

1886

1888

1890 Special & General

1892

1894

1896

1898

1900

1902

1904

1906 (Special)

1906 (General)

1908

1910

1912

1914

1916

1918

1920

1922

1924

1926

1928

1930

1932

1934

1936

1938

1940

1942

1944

1946

1948

1950

1952

1954

1956

1958

1960

1962

1963 (Special)

1964

1966

1968

1970

1972

1974

1976

1978

1980

1982

1984

1986

1988

1990

1992

1994

1996

1998

2000

2002

2004

2006

2008

2010

2012

2014

2016

2018

2020

2022

See also 

 List of United States congressional districts
 California's congressional districts

References

External links 
 GovTrack.us: California's 1st congressional district
 RAND California Election Returns: District Definitions (out of date)
 California Voter Foundation map - CD01 (out of date)

01
Government of Butte County, California
Government of Glenn County, California
Government of Lassen County, California
Government of Modoc County, California
Government of Nevada County, California
Government of Placer County, California
Government of Plumas County, California
Government of Shasta County, California
Government of Sierra County, California
Government of Siskiyou County, California
Government of Tehama County, California
Sacramento Valley
Sierra Nevada (United States)
Shasta Cascade
Alturas, California
Chico, California
Downieville, California
Grass Valley, California
Mount Shasta
Mount Shasta, California (city)
Nevada City, California
Oroville, California
Paradise, California
Quincy, California
Red Bluff, California
Redding, California
South Lake Tahoe, California
Truckee, California
Yreka, California
Constituencies established in 1865
1865 establishments in California